No. 603 (City of Edinburgh) Squadron is a squadron of the Royal Auxiliary Air Force, based in Edinburgh, Scotland. On reforming on 1 October 1999, the primary role of 603 Squadron was as a Survive to Operate squadron, as well as providing force protection.

603 Sqn re-roled to become a reserve RAF Police unit from 1 April 2013.  The Squadron retains a squadron's complement of RAF Regiment as part of its overall contribution to Force Protection and it still operates from a magnificent Victorian Town Mansion close to Edinburgh's city centre, as it has since the Town Headquarters was bought for the squadron in 1925.

Queen Elizabeth II is the Honorary Air Commodore to the Squadron, with those duties routinely carried out by Air Marshal Sir David Walker.

History

Formation and early years
No. 603 Squadron was formed on 14 October 1925 at RAF Turnhouse as a day bomber unit of the Auxiliary Air Force. Originally equipped with DH.9As and using Avro 504Ks for flying training, the squadron re-equipped with Wapitis in March 1930, these being replaced by Harts in February 1934. On 24 October 1938, No. 603 was redesignated a fighter unit and flew Hinds until the arrival of Gladiators at the end of March 1939.

Second World War
In August 1939, the squadron began to transition to Spitfires. As war approached the squadron was put on a full-time footing, and within two weeks of the outbreak of the Second World War, Brian Carbury was permanently attached and the squadron began to receive Spitfires, passing on its Gladiators to other squadrons during October.

On Spitfires

Scotland was in range of Nazi Germany's long-range bombers and reconnaissance aircraft. The Luftwaffe's main operations being mainly against the Royal Naval Home Fleet anchored in Scapa Flow. The squadron was operational with Spitfires in time to intercept the first German air raid on the British Isles on 16 October, when it shot down a Junkers Ju 88 bomber into the Firth of Forth north of Port Seton – the first enemy aircraft to be shot down over Great Britain since 1918, and the first RAF victory in the Second World War. It remained on defensive duties in Scotland until 27 August 1940, when it moved on rotation to Southern England, based with No 11 Group at RAF Hornchurch, where it was operational from 27 August 1940 for the remaining months of the Battle of Britain.

Two days after the squadron became operational in southern England, Carbury claimed the first of his 15½ victories, becoming the fifth highest scoring fighter ace of the battle. He was awarded the Distinguished Flying Cross and Bar with 603 Squadron during the battle. P/O R. 'Rasp' Berry claimed some 9 (of an eventual total of 17) victories during this time, while P/O 'Sheep' Gilroy claimed over 6 victories. Plt Off Richard Hillary (5 victories) was shot down on 3 September in combat with Bf 109s of Jagdgeschwader 26 off Margate at 10:04hrs – rescued by the Margate lifeboat, he was severely burned and spent the next three years in hospital, during which time he wrote a book, The Last Enemy. By the end of the Battle of Britain, according to more recent academic research including the scrutiny of German records, 603 Squadron were identified as the highest-scoring Battle of Britain fighter squadron.

Returning to Scotland at the end of December, Carbury damaged a Ju 88 on Christmas Day over St Abb's Head, before leaving squadron in January 1941 as an instructor at the Central Flying School. In May 1941, the squadron moved south again to take part in sweeps over France (termed "rhubarbs"), until the end of the year.

After a further spell in Scotland, No. 603 left in April 1942 for the Middle East where its ground echelon arrived early in June. Concurrently, Flt Sgt Joe Dalley moved from the squadron to PRU duties and flew a Spitfire PR direct from RAF Benson to Malta, joining No. 69 Squadron RAF to become one of four pilots known as the "Eyes and Ears" on the Island. The squadron's aircraft were embarked on the U.S. aircraft carrier  and flown off to Malta on 20 April to reinforce the island's beleaguered fighters. After nearly four months defending Malta, the remaining pilots and aircraft were absorbed by 229 Squadron on 3 August 1942.

On Beaufighters
At the end of June 1942, No. 603's ground echelon had moved to Cyprus, where it spent six months as a servicing unit before returning to Egypt. In February 1943, Bristol Beaufighters and crews arrived to begin convoy patrols and escort missions along the North African coast and in August sweeps over German held islands in the Aegean and off Greece began. Attacks on enemy shipping continued until the lack of targets enabled the squadron to be returned to the UK in December 1944.

Spitfires again
On 10 January 1945, No. 603 reassembled at RAF Coltishall and by curious coincidence, took over the Spitfires of No. 229 Squadron RAF and some of its personnel, the same squadron which had absorbed No. 603 at Ta' Qali in 1942. Fighter-bomber sweeps began in February over the Netherlands and continued until April, when the squadron returned to its home base at Turnhouse for the last days of the war. On 15 August 1945, the squadron was disbanded.

Post war
603 Sqn reformed as a unit of the Auxiliary Air Force on 10 May 1946 and began recruiting personnel to man a Spitfire squadron during June at RAF Turnhouse. Receiving its first Spitfire in October, it flew this type until conversion to De Havilland Vampire FB.5s in May 1951. By July it was completely equipped and the type was flown until disbandment on 10 March 1957.

Present role
The new 603 Squadron was formed from No. 2 (City of Edinburgh) Maritime Headquarters Unit (MHU) in October 1999. It was used to provide the basis for the new No. 602 (City of Glasgow) Squadron RAuxAF in 2006 while 603 remained in Edinburgh. To commemorate the 50th Anniversary of the formation of the Battle of Britain Memorial Flight in 2007, for the next 2 seasons the Flight's Supermarine Spitfire IIa, P7350, which fought in 603 Sqn during the Battle of Britain carried the 603 Squadron letters XT-L, those of Gerald 'Stapme' Stapleton's personal aircraft.

For a number of years up until 2013 the  primary trade available at 603 Sqn was RAF Regiment although the Squadron also supported small numbers in the Mission Support and Flight Operations trades, However, in late 2012 it was announced that during 2013 the squadron would begin recruiting for RAF Police and the Squadron is now primarily a RAF Police unit, with an embedded Flight of RAF Regiment.

Aircraft operated

Commanding officers

Notable personnel
 Flt Lt Brian Carbury DFC*, who claimed 15½ victories with No. 603, making him the fourth-highest scoring ace of the Battle of Britain
Flight Lieutenant Richard Hillary, Spitfire pilot who was shot down on 3 September 1940, was badly burned, and wrote a book The Last Enemy.
Squadron Leader B. G. 'Stapme' Stapleton who shot down Franz von Werra, who became the only German PoW to escape and return to the Third Reich.

Freedom of the City of Edinburgh
After a vote by the council in February 2018, Lord Provost of Edinburgh Frank Ross presented The Freedom of the City of Edinburgh to the Squadron at the City Chambers on Tuesday 3 July 2018.  The Parade was followed by a private reception in the Palace of Holyroodhouse where the Squadron was hosted by its Royal HAC, Queen Elizabeth.

Her Majesty The Queen's Platinum Jubilee
With HM the Queen as the Squadron's Royal Honorary Air Commodore, the Squadron was tasked with providing personnel to join the RAF detachment that made up part of the military parade as part of Her Majesty The Queen's Platinum Jubilee Pageant parade on Sunday 5 June 2022.

See also
List of Royal Air Force aircraft squadrons

References

Notes

Bibliography

External links

 Official RAF 603 Sqn RAuxAF website
 Second World War Ex-RAF website – Reuniting friends and lost pals
 Battle-of-Britain.co.uk 603 Sqn website
 Photographs  of 603 Sqn during WW2
 Aces High II game website – 603 Sqn
 Battle of Britain Memorial Flight website
 Details of Spitfire P7350

603 Squadron
Fighter squadrons of the Royal Air Force in World War II
RAF squadrons involved in the Battle of Britain
Military units and formations established in 1925